Correa reflexa var. speciosa, also known as eastern correa,  is a variety of Correa reflexa, a shrub native to Australia.

Description
The pendent, tubular flowers are red with pale yellow tips.

Taxonomy
The subspecies was originally formally described as a species in its own right, Correa speciosa in 1811 in The Botanist's Repository for New and Rare Plants.  It was reclassified as  subspecies of Correa reflexa by Paul G. Wilson in the botanical journal Nuytsia in 1998

Hybrids with Correa aemula and Correa reflexa var. scabridula have been recorded where populations intersect.

Distribution
The subspecies occurs in New South Wales and Victoria in dry sclerophyll woodland and on coastal dunes.

References

reflexa var. speciosa
Flora of New South Wales
Flora of Victoria (Australia)
Taxa named by Paul G. Wilson